Dancing with the Stars: Season 3 was the third season of the Korean TV show based on the British television series Strictly Come Dancing. The hosts were Lee Deok-hwa and Kim Gyu-ri.

Couples

Scores

Red numbers indicate the lowest score for each week.
Green numbers indicate the highest score for each week.
 indicates the couple eliminated that week.
 indicates the winning couple (the couple that received the highest combined total of judges' scores and viewers' votes).
 indicates the runner-up couple.
 indicates the third-place couple.

Averages 
This table only counts dances scored on the traditional 30-points scale.

Highest and lowest scoring performances 
The best and worst performances in each dance according to the judges' marks are as follows:

Couples' Highest and Lowest Scoring Dances

According to the traditional 30-point scale:

Weekly scores and songs
Unless indicated otherwise, individual judges scores in the charts below (given in parentheses) are listed in this order from left to right: Park Sang-won, Alex Kim, Kim Joo-won.

Week 1
Running order

Week 2
Running order

Week 3
Running order

Week 4
Running order

Week 5
Running order

Week 6: Movie Week
Running order

Week 7: 70s and 80s Week
Running order

Week 8: Personal Story Week
Running order

Week 9: Fusion Week
Running order

Week 10
Running order

Week 11: Semi-finals
Note: As their second dance, every couple performed a Freestyle routine based on a Latin dance they had already performed previously in the competition. Each couple was accompanied by guest singer(s) of their choice.
Running order

Week 12: Finals
Note: Both couples performed the Samba as their first dance. For their second dance, the couples were allowed to choose the style they wanted to perform. Fei & Su-ro chose the Cha-cha-cha, while Kyung-ho & Hye-sang chose the Paso Doble.

Running order

Other performances

Dance chart 
The celebrities and professional partners danced one of these routines for each corresponding week:
 Week 1: One unlearned dance
 Week 2: One unlearned dance
 Week 3: Cha-cha-cha or Rumba or Salsa
 Week 4: Waltz or Jive or Tango
 Week 5: Quickstep or Samba or Paso Doble
 Week 6: One unlearned or repeated dance (Movie Week)
 Week 7: One unlearned or repeated dance (70s & 80s Week)
 Week 8: One unlearned or repeated dance (Personal Story Week)
 Week 9: One dance of two combined styles (Fusion)
 Week 10: Cha-cha-cha and Paso Doble
 Week 11: Jive and Freestyle based on a repeated Latin dance
 Week 12: Samba and a repeated Latin dance

 Highest scoring dance
 Lowest scoring dance
 Danced, but not scored

References

External links 
Official site

South Korea
2013 South Korean television seasons